In linguistics, apophony (also known as ablaut, (vowel) gradation, (vowel) mutation, alternation, internal modification, stem modification, stem alternation, replacive morphology, stem mutation, internal inflection etc.) is any alternation within a word that indicates grammatical information (often inflectional).

Description
Apophony is exemplified in English as the internal vowel alternations that produce such related words as

 sng, sng, sng, sng
 bnd, bnd
 bld, bld
 brd, brd
 dm, dm
 fd, fd
 l, l
 rse, rse, rsen
 wve, wve
 ft, ft
 gse, gse
 tth, tth

The difference in these vowels marks variously a difference in tense or aspect (e.g. sing/sang/sung), transitivity (rise/raise), part of speech (sing/song), or grammatical number (goose/geese).

That these sound alternations function grammatically can be seen as they are often equivalent to grammatical suffixes (an external modification). Compare the following:

The vowel alternation between i and a indicates a difference between present and past tense in the pair sing/sang. Here the past tense is indicated by the vowel a just as the past tense is indicated on the verb jump with the past tense suffix -ed. Likewise, the plural suffix -s on the word books has the same grammatical function as the presence of the vowel ee in the word geese (where ee alternates with oo in the pair goose/geese).

Consonants, too, can alternate in ways that are used grammatically. An example is the pattern in English of verb-noun pairs with related meanings but differing in voicing of a postvocalic consonant:

Most instances of apophony develop historically from changes due to phonological assimilation that are later grammaticalized (or morphologized) when the environment causing the assimilation is lost. Such is the case with English goose/geese and breath/breathe.

Types
Apophony may involve various types of alternations, including vowels, consonants, prosodic elements (such as tone, syllable length), and even smaller features, such as nasality (on vowels).

The sound alternations may be used inflectionally or derivationally. The particular function of a given alternation will depend on the language.

Vowel gradation

Apophony often involves vowels. Indo-European ablaut (English sing-sang) and Germanic umlaut (goose-geese), mentioned above, are well attested examples. Another example is from Dinka:

When it comes to plurals, a common vowel alteration in Assyrian Neo-Aramaic (a Semitic language) is shifting the ɑ sound to e as shown in this table:

The vowel alternation may involve more than just a change in vowel quality. In Athabaskan languages, such as Navajo, verbs have series of stems where the vowel alternates (sometimes with an added suffix) indicating a different tense-aspect. Navajo vowel ablaut, depending on the verb, may be a change in vowel, vowel length, nasality, and/or tone. For example, the verb stem  'to handle an open container' has a total of 16 combinations of the 5 modes and 4 aspects, resulting in 7 different verb stem forms (i.e.

Another verb stem |  'to cut' has a different set of alternations and mode-aspect combinations, resulting in 3 different forms (i.e. ,):

Prosodic apophony

Various prosodic elements, such as tone, syllable length, and stress, may be found in alternations.  For example, Vietnamese has the following tone alternations which are used derivationally:

Albanian uses different vowel lengths to indicate number and grammatical gender on nouns:

English has alternating stress patterns that indicate whether related words are nouns (first syllable stressed) or verbs (second syllable stressed). This tends to be the case with words in English that came from Latin:

Prosodic alternations are sometimes analyzed as not as a type of apophony but rather as prosodic affixes, which are known, variously, as suprafixes, superfixes, or simulfixes.

Consonant apophony

Consonant alternation is commonly known as consonant mutation or consonant gradation. Bemba indicates causative verbs through alternation of the stem-final consonant. Here the alternation involves spirantization and palatalization:

 

Celtic languages are well known for their initial consonant mutations.

Indo-European linguistics

Indo-European ablaut

In Indo-European linguistics, ablaut is the vowel alternation that produces such related words as sing, sang, sung, and song. The difference in the vowels results from the alternation (in the Proto-Indo-European language) of the vowel e with the vowel o or with no vowel.

To cite a few other examples of Indo-European ablaut, English has a certain class of verbs, called strong verbs, in which the vowel changes to indicate a different grammatical tense-aspect.

As the examples above show, a change in the vowel of the verb stem creates a different verb form. Some of the verbs also have a suffix in the past participle form.

Umlaut

In Indo-European linguistics, umlaut is the vowel fronting that produces such related words as foot > feet or strong > strength. Some weak verbs show umlaut in the present tense, with the past tense representing the original vowel: bought > buy (>). Hundreds of similar examples can be found in English, German, Dutch and other languages.

Ablaut versus umlaut
In Indo-European historical linguistics the terms ablaut and umlaut refer to different phenomena and are not interchangeable. Ablaut is a process that dates back to Proto-Indo-European times, occurs in all Indo-European languages, and refers to (phonologically) unpredictable vowel alternations of a specific nature. From an Indo-European perspective, it typically appears as a variation between o, e, and no vowel, although various sound changes result in different vowel alternations appearing in different daughter languages.

From a diachronic (historical) perspective, the distinction between ablaut and umlaut is very important, particularly in the Germanic languages, as it indicates where and how a specific vowel alternation originates.  It is also important when taking a synchronic (descriptive) perspective on old Germanic languages such as Old English, as umlaut was still a very regular and productive process at the time.  When taking a synchronic perspective on modern languages, however, both processes appear very similar.  For example, the alternations seen in sing/sang/sung and foot/feet both appear to be morphologically conditioned (e.g. the alternation appears in the plural or past tense, but not the singular or present tense) and phonologically unpredictable.

By analogy, descriptive linguists discussing synchronic grammars sometimes employ the terms ablaut and umlaut, using ablaut to refer to morphological vowel alternation generally (which is unpredictable phonologically) and umlaut to refer to any type of regressive vowel harmony (which is phonologically predictable). Ambiguity can be avoided by using alternative terms (apophony, gradation, alternation, internal modification for ablaut; vowel harmony for umlaut) for the broader sense of the words.

Stem alternations and other morphological processes
Stem modifications (i.e. apophony) may co-occur with other morphological processes, such as affixation. An example of this is in the formation of plural nouns in German:

Here the singular/plural distinction is indicated through umlaut and additionally by a suffix -er in the plural form. English also displays similar forms with a -ren suffix in the plural and a -en suffix in the past participle forms along with the internal vowel alternation:

Chechen features this as well:

A more complicated example comes from Chickasaw where the positive/negative distinction in verbs displays vowel ablaut along with prefixation and infixation:

Transfixation

The nonconcatenative morphology of the Afroasiatic languages is sometimes described in terms of apophony. The alternation patterns in many of these languages is quite extensive involving vowels and consonant gemination (i.e. doubled consonants). The alternations below are of Modern Standard Arabic, based on the root  'write' (the symbol  indicates gemination on the preceding consonant):

Other analyses of these languages consider the patterns not to be sound alternations, but rather discontinuous roots with discontinuous affixes, known as transfixes (sometimes considered simulfixes or suprafixes). Some theoretical perspectives call up the notion of morphological templates or morpheme "skeletons".

It would also be possible to analyze English in this way as well, where the alternation of goose/geese could be explained as a basic discontinuous root g-se that is filled out with an infix -oo- "(singular)" or -ee- "(plural)". Many would consider this type of analysis for English to be less desirable as this type of infixal morphology is not very prevalent throughout English and the morphemes -oo- and -ee- would be exceedingly rare.

According to Ghil'ad Zuckermann, "Israeli" (Modern Hebrew) has many verbs that follow the Indo-European ablaut rather than the Semitic  transfixation. Zuckermann argues that  is similar to Indo-European stems such as English s⌂ng (as in sing-sang-song-sung) and German  'speak' (as in ).

Replacive morphemes
Another analytical perspective on sound alternations treats the phenomena not as merely alternation but rather a "replacive" morpheme that replaces part of a word. In this analysis, the alternation between goose/geese may be thought of as goose being the basic form where -ee- is a replacive morpheme that is substituted for oo.

 goose → g-ee-se

This usage of the term morpheme (which is actually describing a replacement process, and not a true morpheme), however, is more in keeping with Item-and-Process models of morphology instead of Item-and-Arrangement models.

Ablaut-motivated compounding

Ablaut reduplication or ablaut-motivated compounding is a type of word formation of "expressives" (such as onomatopoeia or ideophones). Examples of these in English include:

 criss-cross
 shilly-shally
 snip-snap
 tic-tac-toe
 tick-tock
 ticky-tacky
 wishy-washy
 zig-zag

Many Turkic languages have the vowel alternation pattern of "low vowel - high vowel" in their reduplicatives, e.g. Turkish .

Here the words are formed by a reduplication of a base and an alternation of the internal vowel.

Some examples in Japanese:
  'rattle'
  'rustle'

Some examples in Chinese:
  ('babbling')
  ('splashing')

See also

 Alternation (linguistics)
 Consonant mutation
 Metaphony
 Morphology (linguistics)
 Nonconcatenative morphology
 References for ablaut

References

Bibliography

 Anderson, Stephen R. (1985). Inflectional morphology. In T. Shopen (Ed.), Language typology and syntactic description: Grammatical categories and the lexicon (Vol. 3, pp. 150–201). Cambridge: Cambridge University Press. (Especially section 1.3 "Stem modifications").
 Asher, R. E. (Ed.). (1994). The Encyclopedia of language and linguistics. Oxford: Pergamon Press. .
 Bauer, Laurie. (2004). A glossary of morphology. Washington, D.C.: Georgetown University Press.
Hamano, Shoko. (1998). The Sound-Symbolic System of Japanese. CSLI Publications,Stanford.
 Haspelmath, Martin. (2002). Understanding morphology. London: Arnold.
 Kula, Nancy C. (2000). The phonology/morphology interface: Consonant mutations in Bemba. In H. de Hoop & T. van der Wouden (Eds.), Linguistics in the Netherlands 2000 (pp. 171–183). Amsterdam: John Benjamins.
 Nguyễn, Đình-Hoà. (1997). Vietnamese: Tiếng Việt không son phấn. Amsterdam: John Benjamins Publishing Company. .
 Sapir, Edward. (1921). Language: An introduction to the study of speech. New York: Harcourt, Brace & Co.
 Spencer, Andrew; & Zwicky, Arnold M. (Eds.). (1998). The handbook of morphology. Oxford: Blackwell.
 Young, Robert W., & Morgan, William Sr.  (1987).  The Navajo language: A grammar and colloquial dictionary (rev. ed.).  Albuquerque: University of New Mexico Press. .

Linguistic morphology